Lust 2 is the third album by Depth Charge, and alias of UK producer Jonathan Saul Kane. It was released only a month after Lust and was originally conceived as a remix companion to the previous album. To date, Lust 2 is the last full-length studio album recorded under the Depth Charge name.

Track list

1. Han Do Jin (Even Heroes Have To Die) (7:36)
2. Django (4:45)
3. Death And Diamonds (Is The Name Of The Game) (3:49) 
4. Cut My Veins (4:36) 
5. Model Does Sexy Weird (1:55)
6. 7 Hill Poison (3:53)
7. Ride (5:54)
8. Murder By Contract (4:28) 
9. I... Always Do! (3:59)
10. Pretty Pretty (5:03)

References

Jonathan Saul Kane albums
1999 albums